Mount Shiloh Missionary Baptist Church is a historic African-American Baptist church in New Bern, Craven County, North Carolina.  It was built in 1924, and is a one-story, rectangular brick church building on a raised basement in the Late Gothic Revival style.  It features a tall projecting, corner tower. A two-story addition for Sunday School classrooms, a kitchen, and dining area was built in the 1970s.

It was listed on the National Register of Historic Places in 2007.

References

African-American history of North Carolina
Baptist churches in North Carolina
Churches in New Bern, North Carolina
Churches on the National Register of Historic Places in North Carolina
Gothic Revival church buildings in North Carolina
Churches completed in 1924
20th-century Baptist churches in the United States
National Register of Historic Places in Craven County, North Carolina